Foldfjord ( or Follfjorden) is a fjord on the island of Ertvågsøy in the municipality of Aure in Møre og Romsdal county, Norway. The fjord's natural surroundings support a large wildlife population, including many red deer. County Road 682 runs along the east shore of the fjord. At the north end, County Road 680 crosses the fjord at a narrow point near Espset.  The fjord flows north where it joins Gjerdavika, an arm off Edøyfjorden.

References

External links
Foldfjord at Norgeskart

Aure, Norway
Fjords of Møre og Romsdal